Ibrahim Al-Faqi or Ibrahim Elfiki (August 5, 1950 – February 10, 2012) was a human development and neuro-linguistic programming expert, was the CEO of the Canadian Training Centre for Human Development, and the founder of Ibrahim Elfiky International Enterprises Inc.

Early life 
Ibrahim Mohammed El-Saied Elfiki in Alexandria, Egypt. He is a table tennis player and the champion of Egyptian Table Tennis League for many years, and represented Egypt in the World Table Tennis Championships in Munich 1969. Married from Amal Atieh and had two daughters, Nancy and Nermin. 

In his professional life, he was promoted to the department director in the hospitality industry in the Helnan Palestine Hotel Alexandria. He immigrated to Canada to study management, and worked there as a dishwasher and a guard for a restaurant and porter in a hotel.

Bibliography 
He has many visible and audio content from his lectures, and had written tens of books, some of them have been translated into English, French, Kurdish, and Indonesian.

Some of his self-help book titles:

 10 Keys To Ultimate Success
 Way to Success and Rich
 On The Road To Sales Mastery: The Ultimate Sales Guide
 The Path of Excellence
 Life without Tension
 Awaken Your Abilities and Make Your Future
 Successful personal secrets
 Control Your Life: To Be More Successful and Happy
 Neuro-linguistic Programming & Unlimited Communication Power
 12 Keys of Highly Successful Managers

Death 
In Friday morning of February 10, 2012, Ibrahim Elfiki, his sister, and their housekeeper have been found dead after a fire break out at his apartment. The fire has started in the Ibrahim Al-Faqi Center for Human Development on the third floor and extended to the rest of the property's floors owned by Al-Faqi and resides in it, which cause to death of Elfiki, and his sister Fawqiyah Muhammad ElFiki (62 years old) and Nawal (The housekeeper).

References 

1950 births
2012 deaths
Self-help writers
Neuro-linguistic programming writers
Canadian people of Egyptian descent